William Ezell (December 23, 1892 – August 2, 1963), was an American blues, jazz, ragtime and boogie-woogie pianist and occasional singer, who was also billed as Will Ezell. He regularly contributed to recordings made by Paramount Records in the late 1920s and early 1930s. Ezell was noted by the music journalist Bruce Eder as "a technically brilliant pianist, showing the strong influence of jazz as well as blues in his work".

Ezell's "Pitchin' Boogie" and Cow Cow Davenport's "Cow Cow Blues" were amongst the earliest boogie-woogie recordings. However, Pinetop Smith's "Pinetop's Boogie Woogie" was the first to use the phrase in the title of a song.

Two of Ezell's more notable solo recordings, "Heifer Dust" and "Barrel House Woman" (both 1929), have been noted for containing "elements of both blues and barrelhouse boogie-woogie in their form".

Biography
Ezell was born in Brenham, Texas, United States, one of six children to Lorenza Ezell, a farm laborer, and his wife Rachel. According to the 1900 United States Census, the family were still living in Brenham. The same source showed that Ezell's mother had died at some point between 1901 and 1910. Ezell found loose employment as a barrelhouse pianist and, by 1917, had relocated to New Orleans, Louisiana, according to his draft record, and was working as a self-employed musician. There is no evidence that Ezell was conscripted at any time. He continued his itinerant work, finding employment at riverside sawmill camps in Louisiana and East Texas.

By the early 1920s, Ezell was working with the blues singer Elzadie Robinson.  Around 1925, Ezell moved to Chicago, Illinois, and made friends with Blind Blake and Charlie Spand. Ezell, along with others such as Spand, was one of the boogie-woogie pianists who, in the 1920s, performed on Brady Street and Hastings Street in Detroit, Michigan. By 1926, Ezell started work for Paramount in Chicago, as they provided regular work for black musicians, which was not always available elsewhere. There is some doubt as to his first recording, but he wrote "Sawmill Blues", which was recorded by Elzadie Robinson (under the pseudonym of Bernice Drake) in October that year. His flexibility in playing differing styles proved popular, and one of his earliest duties was accompanying Lucille Bogan on "Sweet Petunia", a song full of Bogan's trademark double entendres. There is evidence that Ezell and Bogan's relationship went beyond the recording studio, to the extent that Bogan's husband considered divorce proceedings.
   
During 1927, Ezell's status at Paramount grew, and he operated under the stewardship of Aletha Dickerson, who had replaced J. Mayo Williams as the head of Paramount's Chicago operations. As well as being an accompanist, arranger, and part-producer for other musicians, Ezell recorded his own material for the label between 1928 and 1929. These tracks included his two best-known recordings, "Mixed Up Rag" and "Heifer Dust". Ezell's playing style was similar to that of Jimmy Blythe. However, he was a popular musician who was warmly recalled by Little Brother Montgomery, who had a similar route to notability. Over his time with Paramount, Ezell's own recordings and his association with Charlie Spand, Baby James and Blind Roosevelt Graves, were amongst the highest quality ever issued by that label, which earlier had a reputation for substandard recordings.

In addition to his musical input, Ezell's duties with Paramount were far reaching. In December 1929, he escorted the body of Blind Lemon Jefferson, who had been one of the label's best selling artists, by railroad back to Jefferson's homeland of Texas for burial. His musical input at Paramount ceased in early 1930, except for his accompaniment of Slim Tarpley on two sides in 1931. Paramount Records was rapidly declining as the effects of the Great Depression began to be felt, and later that year Ezell was back to playing in Louisiana, accompanying Clarence Hall. Ezell's whereabouts in the later 1930s are largely unknown, but the researcher John Steiner noted that Cripple Clarence Lofton, who owned a club in Chicago, hosted on stage Ezell, Spand, Leroy Garnett and others through the end of World War II. Records indicate that Ezell continued to be based in Chicago during this time. He worked at their Crane Technical School, operated as part of the New Deal laws, although whether he was employed as an instructor or a maintenance worker is not certain.

Ezell died in Chicago in 1963 in Chicago, at the age of 70. His death was not reported in any newspaper obituaries.

In 1992, Document Records issued a compilation album containing 23 tracks he recorded during his time with Paramount, from February 1927 to January 1931.

Discography

Known recordings

Compilation album

See also
List of blues musicians
List of boogie woogie musicians
List of ragtime musicians

Notes

References

External links
 Illustrated Will Ezell discography

1892 births
1963 deaths
American jazz musicians
American blues pianists
American male pianists
American blues singers
Songwriters from Texas
Boogie-woogie pianists
Ragtime pianists
American jazz pianists
Paramount Records artists
Singers from Texas
People from Brenham, Texas
20th-century American singers
20th-century American pianists
Jazz musicians from Texas
20th-century American male singers
American male jazz musicians
American male songwriters